OISC may refer to:
Office of the Immigration Services Commissioner in the United Kingdom
Oisc of Kent, an early king of Kent
One-instruction set computer